Elena Dementieva and Flavia Pennetta were the defending champions, but lost in second round to Virginia Ruano Pascual and Paola Suárez.

Virginia Ruano Pascual and Paola Suárez won the title, defeating Daniela Hantuchová and Ai Sugiyama 6–3, 6–4 in the final. It was the 35th doubles title for Ruano Pascual and the 40th title for Suárez, in their respective careers. It was also the 1st doubles title of the year for both players.

Seeds

Draw

External links
 Main and Qualifying Draws

JPMorgan Chase Open